St. Thomas Aquinas High School is a coeducational Catholic high school in Dover, New Hampshire, United States, in the Roman Catholic Diocese of Manchester. It has a student population of approximately 455 and a faculty of 55.

History 
In August 1959, Matthew F. Brady, Bishop of Manchester, opened the fundraising drive for St. Thomas Aquinas High School. When Bishop Brady suddenly died, Cardinal Richard Cushing of Boston kept his last project alive. Cardinal Cushing greeted the new bishop, Ernest J. Primeau, with the advice, "Go on with St. Thomas Aquinas."

The diocesan co-educational school opened in 1960 with a freshman class only. Serving seventeen parishes in southeastern New Hampshire, the school was staffed by two diocesan priests, seven School Sisters of Notre Dame and one layman. When STA graduated its class of 219 in 1964, the faculty had grown to six priests, twenty-one sisters (requiring a new convent) and four lay teachers.

By the late 1960s, enrollment topped nine hundred students, making St. Thomas Aquinas a Class L power in athletics. A nationwide trend toward declining enrollments, combined with the higher cost of salaries as the number of teaching sisters fell, brought St. Thomas through a series of challenges throughout the 1970s.

Beginning in the mid-1980s through the 1990s St. Thomas Aquinas showed a steady and dramatic increase in enrollment. During this period the school enhanced and expanded the academic and extracurricular programs available to students. The convent, named Notre Dame Hall, was converted to provide additional classroom space and to house the Guidance Department, which includes offices, a library, and a conference area. Today the school is at its maximum enrollment.

Athletics 

The school's sports teams compete as the "Saints". Teams of note include football, soccer, swimming and diving, ice hockey, basketball, lacrosse, tennis, track and field, alpine skiing, cross country, and baseball. The Ice Hockey team competes as one of the four Catholic schools in the state in the NHIAA Division II.

In 2011–12, STA was state champion in football (Div IV), girls' swimming, baseball (Div II), and girls' tennis (Div II). The school was a finalist in girls' volleyball and boys' lacrosse. Tennis player Julia Keenan became the first high school athlete in New Hampshire to win four straight individual titles in any sport.

In 2012–13, the girls' volleyball team repeated as state finalists and the girls' tennis team repeated as state champions.

Overall, St. Thomas Aquinas has won 30 state team championships in the last 16 years, along with dozens of individual titles.

Notable alumni 

Among St. Thomas Aquinas' graduates are Ron Fortier, comic book and pulp writer best known for his work on The Green Hornet, Brendan DuBois, author of numerous novels including Resurrection Day, Olympic runner Rachel Schneider and Baltimore Orioles' baseball player Ryan McKenna.

References

External links

Official website

Catholic secondary schools in New Hampshire
Buildings and structures in Dover, New Hampshire
Educational institutions established in 1960
Schools in Strafford County, New Hampshire
1960 establishments in New Hampshire
Roman Catholic Diocese of Manchester
Private high schools in New Hampshire